Durim Badalli (born 16 September 1990 in Prizren, Kosovo) is a Swiss footballer of Albanian descent, who plays for FC Naters.

Club career
He has played for Teuta Durrës in the Albanian Superliga. Features: Durim Badalli is a left-back to left foot naturale.giocatore be able to defend and attack. It's very physically gifted player with great sound natural strengths are its strong one on one defensive. player also has good offensive push.

Personal life
His younger brother Pajtim Badalli is a goalkeeper who also played for KF Teuta.

References

1990 births
Living people
Sportspeople from Prizren
Kosovo Albanians
Swiss people of Albanian descent
Association football defenders
Swiss men's footballers
Kosovan footballers
FC Mendrisio players
GC Biaschesi players
FC Naters players
KF Teuta Durrës players
KF Vllaznia Shkodër players
FC Tuggen players
Kategoria Superiore players
Kosovan expatriate footballers
Kosovan expatriate sportspeople in Albania
Swiss expatriate sportspeople in Albania
Expatriate footballers in Albania